Ahmad Johnie bin Zawawi (born  1963) is a Malaysian politician who has been serving as the Member of the Dewan Rakyat for Igan since 2018. He is also the non-executive Chairman of Indah Water since 2020.

Early career 
Johnie was born in Daro and obtained a bachelor's degree in political science from National University of Malaysia (UKM) in 1986. He used to work at the Royal Malaysian Customs Department from 1988 to 2000 before becoming the Chief Operating Officer of The Sarawak Press and Warta Distributions (2000-2004), as well as WHS Holdings (2004-2015).

Political career 
He contested for Igan as the then ruling Barisan Nasional (BN) candidate at the 2018 election and defeated the Pakatan Harapan (PH) candidate Andri Zulkarnaen Hamden.

On 13 May 2020, Johnie was appointed non-executive Chairman of Indah Water by the then Prime Minister Muhyiddin Yassin.

Personal life 
Johnie has three children with his wife. He is of Melanau descent.

Election results

Honour

  Companion of the Order of the Star of Sarawak (JBS) (2023)

References

External links 
 Ahmad Johnie Zawawi on Facebook

1960s births
Living people
Malaysian politicians
Melanau people
Malaysian Muslims